K. G. Neelakantan Nambudiripad  (27 May 1924- 20 September 2012) was an Indian politician and leader of Communist Party of India. He represented the Changanassery constituency in the 3rd Kerala Legislative Assembly.

References

Communist Party of India politicians from Kerala

1924 births

2012 deaths